Sochacki (feminine: Sochacka; plural: Sochaccy) is a Polish surname. Notable people with this surname include:

 Anna Sochacka (1932–2020), Polish speed skater
 James Sochacki, American mathematician who developed the Parker–Sochacki method
 Jerzy Czeszejko-Sochacki (1892–1933), Polish politician

See also
 

Polish-language surnames